The discography of British singer-songwriter Nicola Hitchcock features four studio albums including two recorded with Saul Freeman for their common project Mandalay. She has also issued one compilation (also with Freeman) and one extended play (as soloist). In addition, Hitchcock has been credited to thirteen singles, seventeen B-sides and eleven other appearances, respectively.

Albums

Studio albums

Compilation albums

EPs

Singles

B-sides

Other appearances

References

External links
 NicolaHitchcock.com > Discography

Discographies of British artists
Pop music discographies